East Prairie School District 73 is an elementary school district located in the northern Cook County Chicago suburb of Skokie. The district is composed of a single facility, known as East Prairie Elementary School. East Prairie Elementary School educates all students in or below grade eight, and also runs a prekindergarten program. The district, in all, has 42 teachers: twelve of those teachers teach primary school students, eight of the teachers teach intermediate school students, another twelve teachers further the education of middle school students, nine teachers lead electives classes, and one last teacher educates the staff on various topics surrounding technology.

References

External links

School districts in Cook County, Illinois
Education in Skokie, Illinois